Secret Rivals 2, a.k.a. Silver Fox Rivals II, is a 1977 Hong Kong martial arts-action film starring Hwang Jang Lee, John Liu and Tino Wong.

Plot
The film picks up almost exactly where the original Secret Rivals ended, namely with the death of the dreaded Silver Fox. Mourning the death of Silver Fox is his brother, Gold Fox (again played by Hwang Jang Lee), who vows revenge against Northern Leg and Southern Fist. But Gold Fox is unable to find Southern Fist and must instead fight his brother (Tino Wong), who is saved in the nick of time by Northern Leg. After escaping, the two once again need to combine to defeat their dreaded enemy. But Gold Fox has taken precautions—he's brought backup: four expert kickers and four expert boxers.

Cast
Hwang Jang Lee – Chin Hu / "Gold Fox"
John Liu – Northern Leg Hsiao Yi Fei
Tino Wong – Southern Fist Jr. Shen Ying Wu
Corey Yuen – Yen Kwai (as Yuen Kwai)
Hsu Hsia - Tang Lang
Yuen Biao - unknown role
Sham Tsim Po - Ying Yang
Yuen Woo Ping - extra
Phillip Ko

External links
 https://www.imdb.com/title/tt0076438/

1977 films
1977 martial arts films
Hong Kong martial arts films
Kung fu films
1970s Hong Kong films